Carl Wilhelm Wilhelmson (12 November 1866, Fiskebäckskil – 24 September 1928, Gothenburg) was a Swedish painter, graphic artist, amateur photographer and art teacher.

Biography 
His father, Anders Wilhelmson, was a "Bästeman" (a type of Naval Master), who died in a shipwreck in 1875. His mother, Amalia, opened a small shop to support the family. Some relatives were in the printing business so, in 1881, he was apprenticed to the lithographers Meyer & Köster in Gothenburg. He also took evening classes at the School of Design and Crafts. He later became a full-time student of Carl Larsson at the Valand Academy.

In 1888, on the recommendation of Larsson and his former employers, he was awarded a scholarship from the Kommerskollegium that enabled him to travel to Leipzig. While there, he worked for several notable lithography firms. Despite this, he remained undecided as to whether he should pursue a career in lithography or strike out on his own as an artist. By 1890, he had saved enough money to move to Paris.

In Paris, he worked as an advertising artist while taking classes from Paul Sérusier and Maurice Denis at the Académie Julian. He may also have studied, at least briefly, with Jules Lefebvre and Tony Robert-Fleury. In 1893, he visited Brittany and, in 1895, had a small showing at the Salon. He returned to Sweden in 1896.

Upon his return, the art patron, Pontus Fürstenberg, invited him to become the Director at the Valand Academy. He accepted and held that position until 1910. In 1901, he married the painter, . One of their children, also became a painter. After leaving the Academy, he opened his own art school, where his students included Ivan Aguéli, Evert Taube, Evert Lundquist,  and Maj Bring. At the invitation of his friend, Hjalmar Lundbohm, he made expeditions to Norrland in 1914 and 1918 and produced several well known paintings in Bohuslän. He was appointed a Professor at the Royal Swedish Academy of Fine Arts in 1925 and became a member in 1926, in reverse of the usual order.

The passenger ferry that operates between Fiskebäckskil and Lysekil is named after him, as is a street in the Lunden district of Gothenburg.

Selected paintings

References

Further reading 
Svenskt konstnärslexikon Part V, pgs. 689–692, Allhems Förlag, Malmö
 Söderlund, Göran: Carl Wilhelmson, Prins Eugens Waldemarsudde, Malmö (2009) 
 Carl Wilhelmson 1866-1928 : målningar, teckningar, grafik (exhibition catalog), Göteborgs konstmuseum (1994) 
 Romdahl, Axel: Carl Wilhelmson, Sveriges allmänna konstförening series, (1938), Norstedt
 Rönnow, Sixten: Carl Wilhelmsons folklivsmålningar, "Svenskarna och deras konst" series (1928) Seelig i distr.

External links 

 Biography from the Nordisk Familjebok @ Project Runeberg
 Biography from the Svenskt biografiskt handlexikon @ Project Runeberg 
 Biography from the Svensk konst och svenska konstnärer i nittonde århundradet @ Project Runeberg 
 More works by Wilhelmson @ ArtNet

1866 births
1928 deaths
Swedish painters
Swedish photographers
Académie Julian alumni